William Grant Mills (August 15, 1877 – March 14, 1933), nicknamed Wee Willie, was a professional baseball pitcher. He briefly pitched for the New York Giants in 1901.

Mills earned his nickname due to his stature; he stood only 5'7" and weighed about 150 lbs.

Mills first pitched for Utica in the New York State League in 1899. He would post a 47-26 record with Utica over two seasons, leading the club to the 1900 New York State League championship. In 1901 he began the season with a 13-game winning streak while playing for Schenectady before being called up by the Giants. However, he would only make two appearances for the Giants, earning the loss in both games, before being returned to Schenectady.

During his career, he also pitched for Montreal, Los Angeles, Baltimore, Rochester, and Toronto.

Mills was the father of Art Mills, who played for the Boston Braves and also coached the Detroit Tigers in their 1945 World Series victory.

References 
Billy Mills and Scott Fiesthumel. Diamond Dynasty: Three Generations in Baseball. Erie Canal Productions, .

External links

1877 births
1933 deaths
New York Giants (NL) players
Major League Baseball pitchers
Baseball players from New York (state)
Fall River Indians players
Hartford Bluebirds players
Newark Colts players
Torrington Demons players
Reading Coal Heavers players
Utica Pentups players
Utica Reds players
Schenectady Electricians players
Montreal Royals players
Rochester Bronchos players
Toronto Maple Leafs (International League) players
Baltimore Orioles (IL) players
Utica Pent-Ups players
Nashville Vols players